BCFS Health and Human Services (formerly Baptist Child and Family Services) is a U.S. 501(c)(3) organization based in San Antonio, Texas, specializing in emergency shelter, foster care, and adoption. It was founded as an orphanage in 1944. By 2014, BCFS ran two large temporary detention centers and six permanent shelters for unaccompanied migrant minors. In 2015, BCFS received more funding than any other Office of Refugee Resettlement contractor and nearly a quarter of total funding designated for the unaccompanied minor's program.

Projects

San Antonio Youth Centers 
In 2000, BCFS was a partner with Texas Youth Commission and Bexar County Juvenile Probation in establishing the first transition center in Texas for youth aging out of foster care with a grant from United States Department of Labor. Former Major League Baseball pitcher Jimmy Morris was hired as a motivational speaker in 2015, saying "It's my job to tell the kids what they're capable of... It's not about me. It's about what God can do through me." 

BCFS has operated Guadalupe Street Coffee and Westside Community Center in San Antonio as a service to area youth and their families in partnership with city agencies, non-profits, and faith-based organizations.

FLDS Shelter 
BCFS coordinated shelter for the 462 children displaced from YFZ Ranch in 2008. Affiliate Baptist Children’s Home Youth Ranch was adapted to support keeping large amounts of siblings together.

Minor Detention Centers 
In 2017, a 10 year-old girl with cerebral palsy was arrested after traveling in an ambulance unaccompanied for a gall bladder operation. Representative Joaquin Castro attempted to visit her at BCFS shelter and was refused access while her deportation status was being determined. District judge Fred Biery suggested that her mother should have been detained as well. The child was released without deportation following objections from the ACLU.

BCFS operated Tornillo tent city, the largest detention camp for minors at the time, from June 2018–January 2019. In December 2018 it is estimated that the camp held more than 2,800 minors, mostly from Central America, and employed 2,000 people. CEO Kevin Dinnin claimed that the organization was pressured to expand their operations by the federal government. Dinnin notified the Department of Health and Human Services on December 17 that the organization would not accept additional detainees. It was announced the following day that controversial fingerprinting requirements would be rolled back to expedite sponsorships. Conditions of the camp were not subject to scrutiny by state agencies and standard FBI fingerprint background checks for employees were waived, raising alarm about the safety of detained minors. 

In 2019, employees at Wayfair staged a walk out in protest of a contract with BCFS for a minor detention facility in Carrizo Springs, Texas, a former Stratton Oilfield Systems "man camp" that has estimated capacity for 1,000 detainees.

References

External links 

BCFS Health and Human Services (GuideStar profile)
Interactive: Federal Children's Shelters in Texas (The Texas Tribune)

Adoption, fostering, orphan care and displacement
Immigration detention centers and prisons in the United States
Non-profit organizations based in Texas
Baptist organizations established in the 20th century